Cao or CAO may refer to:

Mythology 
Cao (bull), a legendary bull in Meitei mythology

Companies or organizations
Air China Cargo, ICAO airline designator CAO
CA Oradea, Romanian football club 
CA Osasuna, Spanish football club
Canadian Association of Orthodontists
Central Allocation Office, cross border electricity transmission capacity auction office
Central Applications Office, Irish organisation that oversees college applications
Civil Aviation Office of Poland
Iran Civil Aviation Organization
Office of the Chief Administrative Officer of the United States House of Representatives
Office of the Compliance Advisor/Ombudsman

Job titles
Chief Academic Officer of a University, often titled the Provost
Chief accounting officer of a company
Chief administrative officer of a company
Chief analytics officer of a company
Compliance Advisor/Ombudsman, an independent office that reviews complaints

Names
Cao (Chinese surname) (曹)
Cao (Vietnamese surname)

People
Cao (footballer, born 1968), Portuguese footballer
Cao Cao (died 220), founder of Cao Wei, China
Cao Hamburger (born 1962), Brazilian director, screenwriter and producer
Cao Pi (c.187–226), emperor of Cao Wei, China
Cao Yu (1910–1996), Chinese playwright
Cao Yupeng (born 1990), Chinese snooker player
Diogo Cão, a 15th-century Portuguese explorer 
Joseph Cao (born 1967), United States politician
Lady of Cao, a Moche mummy, Peru
Longbing Cao (born 1969), data scientist

Places
Cao (state), a Chinese vassal state of the Zhou Dynasty (1046 - 221 BCE)
Cao County, Shandong, China
Cao Wei, also called Wei, one of the regimes that competed for control of China during the Three Kingdoms period (220 - 280 CE)

Other uses
CaO, the chemical symbol for calcium oxide
Cão!, an album by Portuguese band Ornatos Violeta
CA Osasuna, a Spanish sport club
a Child Arrangement Order under English family law
Chlorophyllide-a oxygenase, an enzyme
Cold air outbreak, an intense and/or prolonged cold weather wave of air
Controller Access Object, as described in the ORiN robot interface